A thermal reservoir, also thermal energy reservoir or thermal bath, is a thermodynamic system with a heat capacity so large that the temperature of the reservoir changes relatively little when a much more significant amount of heat is added or extracted. As a conceptual simplification, it effectively functions as an infinite pool of thermal energy at a given, constant temperature. Since it can act as a source and sink of heat, it is often also referred to as a heat reservoir or heat bath. 

Lakes, oceans and rivers often serve as thermal reservoirs in geophysical processes, such as the weather. In atmospheric science, large air masses in the atmosphere often function as thermal reservoirs.

Since the temperature of a thermal reservoir  does not change during the heat transfer, the change of entropy in the reservoir is

The microcanonical partition sum  of a heat bath of temperature  has the property

where  is the Boltzmann constant. It thus changes by the same factor when a given amount of energy is added. The exponential factor in this expression can be identified with the reciprocal of the Boltzmann factor.

For an engineering application, see geothermal heat pump.

References

Thermodynamics